In biology, Lipotriches is a large genus of sweat bees in the family Halictidae, distributed widely throughout the Eastern Hemisphere though absent from Europe. There are nearly 200 species in 9 subgenera. They commonly have prominent bands of hair on the margins of the metasomal segments.

Description and biology

Members of this genus are important pollinators of plants, especially grasses, in fact 5 species of this genus from South Africa are recorded to gather grass pollen, with four doing so exclusively. They often have more slender bodies relative to other nomiine bees.

Species

 Lipotriches ablusa (Cockerell, 1931)
 Lipotriches acaciae (Cockerell, 1935)
 Lipotriches adelaidella (Cockerell, 1910)
 Lipotriches aenea (Smith, 1875)
 Lipotriches aenescens (Friese, 1912)
 Lipotriches aerata (Smith, 1875)
 Lipotriches alberti (Cockerell, 1942)
 Lipotriches albitarsis (Friese, 1930)
 Lipotriches alboscopacea (Friese, 1917)
 Lipotriches alternata (Cockerell, 1942)
 Lipotriches amatha (Cockerell, 1935)
 Lipotriches analis (Friese, 1924)
 Lipotriches analis (Benoist, 1964)
 Lipotriches andrei (Vachal, 1897)
 Lipotriches antennata (Smith, 1875)
 Lipotriches apicata (Cockerell, 1936)
 Lipotriches argentifrons (Smith, 1862)
 Lipotriches armatipes (Friese, 1930)
 Lipotriches armatula (Dalla Torre, 1896)
 Lipotriches arnoldi (Friese, 1930)
 Lipotriches aurata (Bingham, 1897)
 Lipotriches aureohirta (Cameron, 1898)
 Lipotriches aureotecta (Cockerell, 1931)
 Lipotriches aurifrons (Smith, 1853)
 Lipotriches austella (Hirashima, 1978)
 Lipotriches australica (Smith, 1875)
 Lipotriches azarensis (Cockerell, 1932)
 Lipotriches babindensis (Cockerell, 1930)
 Lipotriches bantarica (Cockerell, 1919)
 Lipotriches basipicta (Wickwar, 1908)
 Lipotriches bechuanella (Cockerell, 1939)
 Lipotriches bequaertiella (Cockerell, 1942)
 Lipotriches betsilei (Saussure, 1890)
 Lipotriches bicarinata (Cameron, 1903)
 Lipotriches bigibba (Saussure, 1890)
 Lipotriches blandula (Vachal, 1903)
 Lipotriches bombayensis (Cameron, 1908)
 Lipotriches brachysoma (Schletterer, 1891)
 Lipotriches brevipennis (Friese, 1915)
 Lipotriches brisbanensis (Cockerell, 1913)
 Lipotriches brooksi (Pauly, 1991)
 Lipotriches burmica (Cockerell, 1920)
 Lipotriches ceratina (Smith, 1857)
 Lipotriches cheesmanae (Michener, 1965)
 Lipotriches chilwensis (Cockerell, 1939)
 Lipotriches cincticauda (Cockerell, 1943)
 Lipotriches cinerascens (Smith, 1875)
 Lipotriches circumnitens (Cockerell, 1946)
 Lipotriches cirrita (Vachal, 1903)
 Lipotriches clavata (Smith, 1853)
 Lipotriches clavicornis (Warncke, 1980)
 Lipotriches clavisetis (Vachal, 1910)
 Lipotriches clypeata (Smith, 1875)
 Lipotriches collaris (Vachal, 1903)
 Lipotriches crassula (Vachal, 1903)
 Lipotriches cribrosa (Spinola, 1843)
 Lipotriches crocodilensis (Pauly, 1990)
 Lipotriches cubitalis (Vachal, 1897)
 Lipotriches cyanella (Cockerell, 1913)
 Lipotriches dentipes (Friese, 1930)
 Lipotriches dentiventris (Smith, 1875)
 Lipotriches derema (Strand, 1914)
 Lipotriches desolata (Cockerell, 1941)
 Lipotriches digitata (Friese, 1909)
 Lipotriches dimissa (Cockerell, 1921)
 Lipotriches doddii (Cockerell, 1905)
 Lipotriches dominarum (Cockerell, 1932)
 Lipotriches echinata (Friese, 1930)
 Lipotriches edirisinghei Pauly, 2006
 Lipotriches elongata (Friese, 1914)
 Lipotriches elongatula (Cockerell, 1915)
 Lipotriches erimae (Friese, 1909)
 Lipotriches esakii (Hirashima, 1961)
 Lipotriches ethioparca (Cockerell, 1935)
 Lipotriches exagens (Walker, 1860)
 Lipotriches excellens (Cockerell, 1929)
 Lipotriches femorata (Friese, 1936)
 Lipotriches ferricauda (Cockerell, 1913)
 Lipotriches fervida (Smith, 1875)
 Lipotriches fimbriata (Vachal, 1897)
 Lipotriches flavitarsis (Friese, 1909)
 Lipotriches flavoviridis (Cockerell, 1905)
 Lipotriches floralis (Smith, 1875)
 Lipotriches fortior (Cockerell, 1929)
 Lipotriches frenchi (Cockerell, 1912)
 Lipotriches friesei (Magretti, 1899)
 Lipotriches fruhstorferi (Pérez, 1905)
 Lipotriches fulvinerva (Cameron, 1907)
 Lipotriches fulvohirta (Smith, 1875)
 Lipotriches fumipennis (Pauly, 2001)
 Lipotriches generosa (Smith, 1875)
 Lipotriches geophila (Cockerell, 1930)
 Lipotriches gilberti (Cockerell, 1905)
 Lipotriches goniognatha (Cockerell, 1919)
 Lipotriches gracilipes (Smith, 1875)
 Lipotriches gratiosa (Friese, 1914)
 Lipotriches grisella (Cockerell, 1913)
 Lipotriches (Lipotriches) guihongi (Zhang et al, 2022)
 Lipotriches guineensis (Strand, 1912)
 Lipotriches guluensis (Cockerell, 1943)
 Lipotriches halictella (Cockerell, 1905)
 Lipotriches hippophila (Cockerell, 1910)
 Lipotriches hirsutissima (Cockerell, 1935)
 Lipotriches hirsutula (Cockerell, 1947)
 Lipotriches hylaeoides (Gerstäcker, 1857)
 Lipotriches hypodonta (Cockerell, 1905)
 Lipotriches inaequalis (Cockerell, 1931)
 Lipotriches inamoena (Benoist, 1950)
 Lipotriches jacobsoni (Friese, 1914)
 Lipotriches johannis (Cockerell, 1946)
 Lipotriches kabindana (Strand, 1920)
 Lipotriches kamerunensis (Friese, 1916)
 Lipotriches kampalana (Cockerell, 1935)
 Lipotriches kangrae (Nurse, 1904)
 Lipotriches kankauana (Strand, 1913)
 Lipotriches kasoutina (Cockerell, 1943)
 Lipotriches katonana (Strand, 1913)
 Lipotriches kondeana (Strand, 1913)
 Lipotriches krombeini (Hirashima, 1978)
 Lipotriches kurandina (Cockerell, 1910)
 Lipotriches lactinea (Vachal, 1903)
 Lipotriches lamellicornis (Friese, 1911)
 Lipotriches langi (Cockerell, 1932)
 Lipotriches latetibialis (Friese, 1924)
 Lipotriches latifacies (Strand, 1911)
 Lipotriches lautula (Cockerell, 1919)
 Lipotriches leucomelanura (Cockerell, 1935)
 Lipotriches ligata (Vachal, 1903)
 Lipotriches lubumbashica (Cockerell, 1943)
 Lipotriches lucidula (Vachal, 1910)
 Lipotriches luridipes (Benoist, 1964)
 Lipotriches maai (Michener, 1965)
 Lipotriches macropus (Friese, 1930)
 Lipotriches magniventris (Friese, 1914)
 Lipotriches makomensis (Strand, 1912)
 Lipotriches meadewaldoi (Brauns, 1912)
 Lipotriches medani (Cockerell, 1942)
 Lipotriches media (Benoist, 1964)
 Lipotriches mediorufa (Cockerell, 1912)
 Lipotriches melanodonta (Cockerell, 1926)
 Lipotriches melanoptera (Cockerell, 1910)
 Lipotriches melanosoma (Benoist, 1964)
 Lipotriches melvilliana (Cockerell, 1929)
 Lipotriches minuta (Benoist, 1964)
 Lipotriches minutula (Friese, 1909)
 Lipotriches miranda (Rayment, 1954)
 Lipotriches modesta (Smith, 1862)
 Lipotriches moerens (Smith, 1875)
 Lipotriches mollis (Smith, 1879)
 Lipotriches montana (Friese, 1930)
 Lipotriches montana (Ebmer, 1978)
 Lipotriches morata (Cockerell, 1920)
 Lipotriches mozambensis (Pauly, 2003)
 Lipotriches muscosa (Cockerell, 1910)
 Lipotriches musgravei (Cockerell, 1929)
 Lipotriches nana (Smith, 1875)
 Lipotriches (Maynenomia) nanensis (Cockerell, 1929)
 Lipotriches natalensis (Cockerell, 1916)
 Lipotriches negligenda (Dalla Torre, 1896)
 Lipotriches nigra (Wu, 1985)
 Lipotriches nitidibasis (Cockerell, 1920)
 Lipotriches notabilis (Schletterer, 1891)
 Lipotriches notiomorpha (Hirashima, 1978)
 Lipotriches nubecula (Smith, 1875)
 Lipotriches nubilosa (Cockerell, 1942)
 Lipotriches nuda (Rayment, 1939)
 Lipotriches oberthuerella (Saussure, 1890)
 Lipotriches obscura (Benoist, 1964)
 Lipotriches odontostoma (Cockerell, 1941)
 Lipotriches opacibasis (Cockerell, 1935)
 Lipotriches orientalis (Friese, 1909)
 Lipotriches pachypoda (Cockerell, 1920)
 Lipotriches palavanica (Cockerell, 1915)
 Lipotriches pallidibasis (Cockerell, 1936)
 Lipotriches pallidicincta (Cockerell, 1932)
 Lipotriches pallidiventer (Cockerell, 1943)
 Lipotriches panganina (Strand, 1911)
 Lipotriches parca (Kohl, 1906)
 Lipotriches patellifera (Westwood, 1875)
 Lipotriches pennata (Friese, 1924)
 Lipotriches perlucida (Cockerell, 1911)
 Lipotriches petterssoni (Pauly, 1991)
 Lipotriches phanerura (Cockerell, 1913)
 Lipotriches phenacura (Cockerell, 1911)
 Lipotriches philippinensis (Cockerell, 1915)
 Lipotriches picardi (Gribodo, 1894)
 Lipotriches pilipes (Smith, 1875)
 Lipotriches platycephala (Cockerell, 1917)
 Lipotriches pristis (Vachal, 1903)
 Lipotriches pseudohalictella (Strand, 1913)
 Lipotriches pulchricornis (Cockerell, 1943)
 Lipotriches pulchriventris (Cameron, 1897)
 Lipotriches purnongensis (Cockerell, 1913)
 Lipotriches quartinae (Gribodo, 1884)
 Lipotriches raialii (Pauly, 2001)
 Lipotriches rainandriamampandryi (Pauly, 2001)
 Lipotriches ranomafanae (Pauly, 2001)
 Lipotriches reginae (Cockerell, 1905)
 Lipotriches regis (Cockerell, 1910)
 Lipotriches reichardia (Strand, 1911)
 Lipotriches rubella (Smith, 1875)
 Lipotriches rufipes (Smith, 1875)
 Lipotriches rufocognita (Cockerell, 1905)
 Lipotriches rugicollis (Friese, 1930)
 Lipotriches rustica (Westwood, 1875)
 Lipotriches ruwenzorica (Cockerell, 1935)
 Lipotriches sanguinolenta (Friese, 1930)
 Lipotriches sansibarica (Strand, 1912)
 Lipotriches satelles (Cockerell, 1912)
 Lipotriches saussurei (Friese, 1902)
 Lipotriches schroederi (Strand, 1914)
 Lipotriches scutellata (Smith, 1875)
 Lipotriches semiaurea (Cockerell, 1905)
 Lipotriches semihirta (Cockerell, 1932)
 Lipotriches semipallida (Cockerell, 1905)
 Lipotriches senegalicola (Strand, 1912)
 Lipotriches setulosa (Benoist, 1962)
 Lipotriches shanganiensis (Cockerell, 1935)
 Lipotriches sicheli (Vachal, 1897)
 Lipotriches sikorai (Pauly, 1991)
 Lipotriches sjoestedti (Friese, 1909)
 Lipotriches smaragdula (Pauly, 1984)
 Lipotriches speciosana (Strand, 1913)
 Lipotriches speculina (Cockerell, 1942)
 Lipotriches sphecodoides (Pauly, 1991)
 Lipotriches spinulifera (Cockerell, 1933)
 Lipotriches stalkeri (Cockerell, 1910)
 Lipotriches stordyi (Cockerell, 1943)
 Lipotriches subarmata (Cockerell, 1943)
 Lipotriches subaustralica (Cockerell, 1910)
 Lipotriches sublucens (Cockerell, 1939)
 Lipotriches submoerens (Cockerell, 1914)
 Lipotriches subnitida (Benoist, 1964)
 Lipotriches swalei (Cockerell, 1939)
 Lipotriches tampoloensis (Pauly, 1991)
 Lipotriches tanganyicensis (Strand, 1913)
 Lipotriches tenuihirta (Cockerell, 1905)
 Lipotriches testacea (Strand, 1913)
 Lipotriches testaceipes (Friese, 1924)
 Lipotriches tetraloniformis (Strand, 1912)
 Lipotriches thor (Cockerell, 1930)
 Lipotriches torrida (Smith, 1879)
 Lipotriches tridentata (Smith, 1875)
 Lipotriches triodonta (Kohl, 1906)
 Lipotriches tristemmae (Pauly, 2001)
 Lipotriches trochanterica (Friese, 1908)
 Lipotriches tuckeri (Friese, 1930)
 Lipotriches tulearensis (Benoist, 1962)
 Lipotriches turneri (Friese, 1924)
 Lipotriches ulongensis (Cockerell, 1929)
 Lipotriches umbiloensis (Cockerell, 1916)
 Lipotriches ustula (Cockerell, 1911)
 Lipotriches vicina (Stadelmann, 1897)
 Lipotriches viciniformis (Cockerell, 1939)
 Lipotriches victoriae (Cockerell, 1910)
 Lipotriches voeltzkowi (Friese, 1907)
 Lipotriches vulpina (Gerstäcker, 1857)
 Lipotriches welwitschi (Cockerell, 1908)
 Lipotriches whitfieldi (Cockerell, 1942)
 Lipotriches willeyi (Cameron, 1905)
 Lipotriches williamsi (Cockerell, 1930)
 Lipotriches yapiensis (Cockerell, 1943)
 Lipotriches yasumatsui (Hirashima, 1961)
 Lipotriches yunnanensis (He & Wu, 1985)
 Lipotriches zuala (Strand, 1911)

References

Halictidae